Lauren G. Wilcox (Lauren G. Wilcox-Patterson) is an American professor and researcher in human–computer interaction and health informatics, known for creating computing systems that enable patient participation in health care as well as patient and family member participation in the technology design process.

Education 
Wilcox earned her Ph.D. in Computer Science from Columbia University in 2013, collaborating closely with graduate students and faculty in the Department of Biomedical Informatics and the Columbia University Irving Medical Center. She holds a B.S. and an M.S. in Computer Science, both from Columbia University, which she earned before returning for her Ph.D.

Career 
Prior to her research career, Wilcox was a Staff Software Engineer at IBM in Austin, Texas and was recognized as an Early Tenure Inventor. After completing her Ph.D., Wilcox joined the Georgia Institute of Technology School of Interactive Computing and was promoted to associate professor with tenure in April 2020.  She directs the Health Experience and Applications Lab at Georgia Tech.  At Georgia Tech, Wilcox has expanded her research scope to focus on how computing technology can meet the health needs of adolescents, including adolescent chronic condition management and adolescent health data privacy. She has also contributed foundational studies on how computing systems can support mental well-being, and the consideration of human well-being as an integral part of technology design.

Wilcox was an inaugural member of the ACM Future of Computing Academy (ACM FCA) and co-authored an ACM FCA blog post in 2018, urging the computing research community to leverage the peer review process to identify and address the broader impacts of computing advancements on society. Since the publication of the blog post, there have been examples of computing conferences requiring authors to submit statements on the broader impacts of their contributions.

Wilcox joined Google in 2019, where she contributed to one of the first published studies examining the use of a deep learning-based AI system in patient care. In 2020, she held a research leadership position in the Wellbeing Lab at Google.

Personal 
Wilcox was born in New York City, but spent most of her childhood years in the Detroit metropolitan area. Before moving back to New York City for college, she played bass guitar in The Von Bondies. She is married to Richard Patterson.

External links 

 
 Stanford University Human-Computer Interaction Seminar
 Microsoft Research - Principles of Intelligence: Learning, health and wellness
 Health Experience and Applications Lab at Georgia Tech

References 

Living people
Georgia Tech faculty
Human–computer interaction researchers
Health informaticians
American women social scientists
American women computer scientists
American computer scientists
21st-century American women scientists
Google employees
Year of birth missing (living people)
American women academics
Columbia School of Engineering and Applied Science alumni